The 2S5 Giatsint-S is a Soviet/Russian 152 mm self-propelled gun. "2S5" is its GRAU designation. It has nuclear, biological, and chemical protection. The 2S5 is capable of engaging targets at longer ranges and at a higher rate of fire than the more widely produced 2S3 Akatsiya 152 mm self-propelled gun, and is capable of firing nuclear projectiles.

Production history 
Production of the 2S5 Giatsint-S started in 1976 along with the towed version the 2A36 Giatsint-B. It uses a chassis modified from the SA-4 Krug surface-to-air missile system with good cross-country mobility, and can carry 30 152 mm rounds with a range of 28 kilometers, or 33-40 kilometers for rocket-assisted projectiles. In addition to high explosives, the gun can also fire HEAT, cluster, smoke and nuclear projectiles. Deploying to fire the gun takes 3 minutes, and it can sustain a rate of fire of 5 to 6 rounds per minute. Most of the crew, with the exception of the gunner, deploys outside of the vehicle while firing. It is usually accompanied by an ammunition carrier with an additional 30 rounds of ammunition.

The 2S5 was introduced into service in 1978, replacing the 130mm M46 field gun battalions in Soviet artillery brigades at the Army and Front level, and has also been known as the M1981 by the United States. Production ceased in 1991.

Operational history 
The 2S5 was first used in combat by the Soviet Union in Soviet–Afghan War. Later, Russian forces used it in the First Chechen War and Second Chechen War.

The 2S5 has been employed by the Ukrainian Army and Russian Army in the war in Donbas.

Operators

Current operators 
 120 
 13
 80 

Army: 399 units (+500 in storage)
Navy: 170 units (+some in storage)
 25, as of September 17th 2022, at least two Giatsint were captured by Ukrainian forces during the Russian Invasion of Ukraine

Former operators 

 Finnish Army: known as 152 TELAK 91. 18 units.

See also 

List of AFVs
List of artillery.

References

External links 
 2S5 Giatsint-S description at the website of its manufacturer – scroll down the page

Self-propelled artillery of the Soviet Union
152 mm artillery
Military vehicles introduced in the 1970s